Greg Boester (born November 27, 1968 in Los Angeles, California) is an American former ski jumper who competed in the 1994 Winter Olympics, and is now a banker at JPMorgan Chase.

In July, 2013, Boester became the president of the U.S. Ski and Snowboard Team Foundation, a non-profit that raises funds for the U.S. Ski and Snowboard Association. In 1996, Boester joined the association's board of directors; in 2004, he joined the foundation's board of trustees.

Boester holds an economics degree from St. Lawrence University and an MBA from the Wharton School at the University of Pennsylvania.

References

External links 
 

1968 births
Living people
Sportspeople from Los Angeles
American male ski jumpers
Olympic ski jumpers of the United States
Ski jumpers at the 1994 Winter Olympics